Sebaga is a genus of ant-loving beetles in the family Staphylinidae. There is one described species in Sebaga, S. ocampi.

References

Further reading

 
 

Pselaphinae
Articles created by Qbugbot